Souls for Sale is the debut album by the rock band Verbena, released in 1997 and the only album in which they appeared as a quartet. It is of note that the UK version of the album has an entirely different, alternative version of "Postcard Blues" lasting 2:30. The album was released on Setanta Records, under license to Merge Records in the US.

Track listing
All songs written by Verbena.

"Hot Blood" – 3:46
"Shaped Like a Gun" – 3:21
"Junk for Fashion" – 5:03
"The Song That Ended Your Career" – 4:25
"The Desert" – 3:16
"Hey, Come On" – 3:01
"Me & Keith" – 4:21
"So What" – 3:23
"Postcard Blues" – 2:54
"Kiss Yourself" – 3:48

Personnel
Scott Bondy – vocals and guitar
Anne Marie Griffin – guitar and vocals
Duquette Johnston – bass guitar
Les Nuby – drums

Production
Producer: Dave Fridmann and Verbena
Producer: Jim Jones (tracks 2, 8, 9, and 10)
Engineer: Dave Fridmann and Verbena
Mixing: Phil Thornalley
Design: Arcrane
Photography: Mark Gooch
Mix studio: RAK studios

Verbena (band) albums
1997 debut albums